James Bethel Gresham, (August 23, 1893 – November 3, 1917) was an American soldier, the first Hoosier serviceman and perhaps the first American serviceman to die in World War I, along with Private Merle Hay of Glidden, Iowa and Private Thomas Enright of Pittsburgh, Pennsylvania.

Early life
James Gresham was born on August 23, 1893, in McLean County, Kentucky. In September 1901, his family moved to Evansville, Indiana, where he attended the Centennial School and he later worked in local furniture factories.

Military service, death, and legacy

Gresham enlisted into the U.S. Army on April 23, 1914, with his service beginning at Jefferson Barracks, St. Louis, Missouri. By June 1914, he was serving in El Paso, Texas under General John J. Pershing.  He shipped out from Fort Bliss for France with the first American soldiers of the American Expeditionary Force in June 1917. Just before daylight on November 3, 1917, Gresham was killed along with Privates Hay and Enright during an early morning raid by the Imperial German Army near Artois, France. Two days later, on 5 November 1917, Enright, Gresham, and Hay were buried near the battlefield where they had died. An inscription marked their graves: "Here lie the first soldiers of the illustrious Republic of the United States who fell on French soil for justice and liberty." Later in 1921, the body was moved to its current resting place in Evansville, Indiana. As a memorial, as the first American casualty of World  a house in Evansville was built in his honor and given to his mother, Alice Dodd.

See also
Albert Mayer (soldier), the first Imperial German Army soldier killed, 1914
Jules Andre Peugeot, the first French Army soldier killed, 1914
John Parr, the first British Army soldier killed, 1914
Thomas Enright, one of the first three American Army soldiers killed, 1917
Merle Hay,  one of the first three American Army soldiers killed, 1917
George Edwin Ellison, the last British Army soldier killed in World  at 9:30 a.m. 11 November
Augustin Trébuchon, last French soldier killed, at 10:45 a.m. 11 November
George Lawrence Price, last Commonwealth soldier killed in World  10:58 a.m. 11 November.
Henry Gunther, last soldier killed in World  at 10:59 a.m. 11 November.

References

External links

 Heiman Blatt (1920). Sons of Men: Evansville's War Record
James Bethel Gresham An Evansville Hero, 1893–1917

1893 births
1917 deaths
American military personnel killed in World War I
United States Army non-commissioned officers
United States Army personnel of World War I